Tritia varicosa is a species of sea snail, a marine gastropod mollusk in the family Nassariidae, the nassa mud snails or dog whelks.

Distribution
This species occurs in European waters, the Mediterranean Sea, the Northeast Atlantic Ocean.

Description

The length of the shell varies between 5 mm and 8 mm.

References

 Nordsieck, F. (1973). Marine shells from the Mediterranean coast of Israel. Argamon. 4 (2-4): 57-63
 Cernohorsky W. O. (1984). Systematics of the family Nassariidae (Mollusca: Gastropoda). Bulletin of the Auckland Institute and Museum 14: 1–356.
 Backeljau, T. (1986). Lijst van de recente mariene mollusken van België [List of the recent marine molluscs of Belgium]. Koninklijk Belgisch Instituut voor Natuurwetenschappen: Brussels, Belgium. 106 pp.
 Hayward, P.J.; Ryland, J.S. (Ed.) (1990). The marine fauna of the British Isles and North-West Europe: 1. Introduction and protozoans to arthropods. Clarendon Press: Oxford, UK. . 627 pp.
 Gofas, S.; Le Renard, J.; Bouchet, P. (2001). Mollusca, in: Costello, M.J. et al. (Ed.) (2001). European register of marine species: a check-list of the marine species in Europe and a bibliography of guides to their identification. Collection Patrimoines Naturels, 50: pp. 180–213
 Muller, Y. (2004). Faune et flore du littoral du Nord, du Pas-de-Calais et de la Belgique: inventaire. [Coastal fauna and flora of the Nord, Pas-de-Calais and Belgium: inventory]. Commission Régionale de Biologie Région Nord Pas-de-Calais: France. 307 pp.
 Stein G. (2019). Die Gattung Tritia Risso, 1826 (Neogastropoda: Nassariidae) im Miozän des Nordseebeckens. Palaeontos. 32: 3-85

External links
 
 Turton W. (1825). Description of some new British shells. Zoological Journal, 2: 361-367
 Lamarck, (J.-B. M.) de. (1822). Histoire naturelle des animaux sans vertèbres. Tome septième. Paris: published by the Author, 711 pp.
 Blainville, H. M. D. de. (1828-1830). Malacozoaires ou Animaux Mollusques. [in Faune Française. Levrault, Paris 320 p., 48 pl]
 Locard, A. (1886). Prodrome de malacologie française. Catalogue général des mollusques vivants de France. Mollusques marins. Lyon: H. Georg & Paris: Baillière. x + 778 pp
 Bucquoy E., Dautzenberg P. & Dollfus G. (1882-1886). Les mollusques marins du Roussillon. Tome Ier. Gastropodes. Paris: Baillière & fils. 570 pp., 66 pls
 Locard, A. (1887). Contributions à la faune malacologique française. X. Monographie des espèces de la famille des Buccinidae. Annales de la Société Linnéenne de Lyon. 33: 17-127, 1 pl
 Galindo, L. A.; Puillandre, N.; Utge, J.; Lozouet, P.; Bouchet, P. (2016). The phylogeny and systematics of the Nassariidae revisited (Gastropoda, Buccinoidea). Molecular Phylogenetics and Evolution. 99: 337-353

varicosa
Gastropods described in 1825